Northern Ohio is an unincorporated community in Poinsett County, Arkansas, United States. A resettlement community was founded at Northern Ohio in 1936 on land bought from the Northern Ohio Cooperage Company.

References

Unincorporated communities in Poinsett County, Arkansas
Unincorporated communities in Arkansas
Arkansas placenames of Native American origin